The 1997 Marseille Open was a men's tennis tournament played on indoor hard courts at the Palais des Sports de Marseille in Marseille, France, and was part of the World Series of the 1997 ATP Tour. The tournament ran from 10 February through 16 February 1997. Second-seeded Thomas Enqvist won the singles title.

Finals

Singles

 Thomas Enqvist defeated  Marcelo Ríos 6–4, 1–0 (Ríos retired)
 It was Enqvist's 1st title of the year and the 11th of his career.

Doubles

 Thomas Enqvist /  Magnus Larsson defeated  Olivier Delaître /  Fabrice Santoro 6–3, 6–4
 It was Enqvist's 2nd title of the year and the 12th of his career. It was Larsson's only title of the year and the 11th of his career.

References

External links
 Official website 
 ATP tournament profile

Marseille Open
Open 13
Marseille Open